Allan William Moncrieff (19 March 1924 – 1 February 2015
) was an Australian rules footballer who played for the Footscray Football Club in the Victorian Football League (VFL).

After playing a couple of games in 1943, Moncreiff's early career was interrupted by his service in the Australian Army in during World War II.

Notes

External links 
		

2015 deaths
1924 births
Australian rules footballers from Melbourne
Western Bulldogs players
People from Cheltenham, Victoria
Australian military personnel of World War II
Military personnel from Melbourne